Frenchs Forest (pron. frenches) is a suburb of northern Sydney, in the state of New South Wales, Australia. Frenchs Forest is 
13 kilometres north of the Sydney central business district in the local government area of Northern Beaches Council. Frenchs Forest is part of Sydney's Northern Beaches region and also considered to be part of the Forest District, colloquially known as The Forest by its locals.

During the 2010s, the suburb underwent rezoning which includes a new hospital, town centre, new relocated high school, 2,200 new homes and $500 million to upgrade the roads around the new Northern Beaches Hospital.

The rezoning was completed in time for the hospital opening in 2019.

History

Aboriginal culture
Prior to the arrival of the First Fleet in Port Jackson in 1788, the area of land we now know as Frenchs Forest, and surrounding Warringah areas, was the home of the Guringai (Ku-ring-gai) language group of the Garigal Aboriginal clan. Evidence of their habitation remains today in the form of rock engravings, rock art, open campsites, rock shelters, scarred trees and middens. The word Warringah has many interpretations including "sign of rain", "across the waves" and "sea".

European settlement
European exploration into Warringah began within the first weeks of settlement at Sydney Cove in 1788. Governor Phillip made a number of journeys throughout the area, detailing the landscape, flora and fauna, as well as observing Aboriginal lifestyle and culture. Although Beacon Hill advertises the "Arthur Phillip lookout" at its peak, it is believed by some historians that Phillip's travels actually took him through Bantry Bay and up into Frenchs Forest to gain views over the area.

In 1853 Simeon Henry Pearce (1821–1886) and his brother James acquired  in this area. The property was later known as Rodborough when it was acquired by James French, a police constable, who also developed the land that became neighbouring Forestville. Despite its relative proximity to Sydney, Frenchs Forest remained predominantly rural throughout the nineteenth century.

Geography 

Frenchs Forest is close to the Garigal National Park. It is elevated (~156 m ASL) regularly having high rainfall compared with the rest of Sydney and is spread along ridgelines surrounded by native bushland. The eastern parts have distant views (3 km) over the Pacific Ocean and the temperature extremes typical of Sydney are moderated by this proximity. The western side has views over Chatswood, St Leonards, North Sydney & The City, bounded by Garigal National Park featuring native wildlife, birds, turtles, wallabies, lizards, snakes. Bush tracks include bluff track and natural bridge track.

Climate 

Frenchs Forest climate is similar to the Climate of Sydney, albeit with a few minor seasonal differences: winters tend to be cooler and wetter than in the city, while summers tend to be less hot.

Commercial areas 
Forestway Shopping Centre is at the intersection of Forestway and Warringah Road. The centre includes an Aldi and Woolworths supermarkets and over 50 speciality stores.

Smaller shopping centres are located at Sorlie Road featuring a variety of restaurants and Skyline shops on Frenchs Forest Road East, the name being derived from the 'Skyline Drive-in Movie Theatre' that existed nearby until the mid-1980s.

Frenchs Forest Town Centre is a proposed shopping mall, aquatic centre and high-rise residential development.

Schools 
Frenchs Forest is home to a number of schools:
 Frenchs Forest Public School 
 Mimosa Public School 
 The Forest High School
 Davidson High School

Churches 
 Frenchs Forest Anglican Church
 Frenchs Forest Uniting Church] (also known as "The Kirk")
 Forest Alliance Church
 Frenchs Forest Baptist

Although named Frenchs Forest Catholic Parish, the three church buildings that make up the parish are located in the adjoining suburbs of Davidson, Forestville & Terrey Hills.

Transport

Road 
The main routes through Frenchs Forest include the east-west Warringah Road (State route A38), connecting Roseville in the west with Brookvale in the east; the north-south Forest Way, starting at Warringah Road in Frenchs Forest and heading north through Belrose to Terrey Hills, connecting with Mona Vale Road (8 km); and the north-south Wakehurst Parkway (State route 22), starting at Narrabeen in the northeast, crossing Frenchs Forest Road and Warringah Road in Frenchs Forest, and heading south to Seaforth, leading to the Spit Bridge. Following any of these three major roads lead to the only three road routes off the Northern Beaches peninsula.

The intersection of Wakehurst Parkway and Warringah Road was the scene of multiple high speed collisions when these two roads were dirt tracks through the bush. To improve this, a blinking light was suspended above the intersection in the first half of the 20th century to warn motorists of the danger, which earned the interesting the enduring name of 'The Blinking Light'.

Buses
Forest Coach Lines connects Frenchs Forest with Chatswood railway station in the west, Westfield Warringah Mall shopping centre at Brookvale in the east and Terrey Hills in the north, with an express bus service running to Town Hall station in the Sydney central business district. Keolis Downer Northern Beaches runs a number of bus lines through the Frenchs Forest area, including the 136 bus service which connects Chatswood to Dee Why, the 173 bus route which connects Milsons Point and Narraweena, and the 169 and E69 bus routes which connect the Sydney central business district with Manly.

Culture
 Frenchs Forest Showground has "off leash" areas for dogs and horse events.

Events
 Forest Funday, is an annual free fair provided by the combined Christian churches of The Forest on ANZAC Day, 25 April at Frenchs Forest Showground.
 Eurofest at Ararat Reserve in mid-September involves all the ethnic clubs in the area.

Clubs
 The Scout Hall.
 The Girls Guides Hall.
 Ararat Reserve (named after the Ararat plains of Ancient Armenia) on Bantry Bay Road features a number of ethnic clubs.

Sport and recreation
 The Warringah Aquatic Centre features an Olympic indoor heated swimming pool and baseball pitches.
 Lionel Watts Oval provides sports fields for Cricket, Australian Rules Football, Soccer, Rugby league, Netball & has a Skate Park.
 A combination cycle/cycle-pedestrian shared/cycle-road path (completed ) from the corner of Wakehurst Parkway and Frenchs Forest Road, connecting Frenchs Forest with Dee Why. The signposting/painted lines on roads is aged and can be a little difficult to follow.
 The fenced playground  for young kids at Lionel Watts Oval (Blackbutts Rd) has a mini-track suitable for toddlers and small kids on tricycles. Rebuilt in 2019.
 Manly Dam Reserve is adjacent to (southeast of) Frenchs Forest, containing pedestrian/mountain bike bush tracks.
 Manly-Warringah Radio Society using callsign VK2MB is the local club for Amateur Radio Operators & services the Frenchs Forest area, with club rooms at Terrey Hills.

Further education and training 
 The Valuers Training institute provides online courses for property valuers.
 Hand On Heart First Aid, in partnership with Allens Training, offers extensive first aid and CPR accreditations for carers, parents, childcare centres and commercial organizations.

Population 
In the 2016 census of Population and Housing, the population of the Frenchs Forest postcode area was 13,473 people. The population was 50.4% females, 49.6% male. In Frenchs Forest,

68.9% of people were born in Australia. The most common countries of birth were England 7.0%, New Zealand 2.2%, China 2.1%, South Africa 1.8% and United States of America 0.9%. 80.8% of people only spoke English at home. Other languages spoken at home included Mandarin 2.1%, Armenian 1.8%, Cantonese 1.6%, French 1.2% and Italian 1.1%. The most common responses for religion were No Religion 30.3%, Catholic 25.3% and Anglican 19.2%.

Of occupied private dwellings in Frenchs Forest, 93.3% were separate houses and 4.7% were semi-detached.

References

External links 
 

 
Suburbs of Sydney
Northern Beaches Council